This is a list of lists of marae (Māori meeting grounds) in the Northland Region of New Zealand.

In October 2020, the Government committed $9,287,603 from the Provincial Growth Fund to upgrade 34 marae, with the intention of creating 388 jobs.

Far North District

Kaipara District

Whangarei District

See also
 Lists of marae in New Zealand
 List of schools in the Northland Region

References

Northland Region, List of marae in the
Marae
Marae in the Northland Region, List of